Sharon Paola Fajardo Sierra (born November 7, 1989 in Puerto Cortés) is a Honduran swimmer, who specialized in sprint freestyle events. She represented her nation Honduras at the 2008 Summer Olympics, and has owned a Honduran record each in both 50 and 100 m freestyle, which were eventually set by Julimar Avila in 2013.

Fajardo received a Universality invitation from FINA to compete as Honduras' lone female swimmer in the women's 50 m freestyle at the 2008 Summer Olympics in Beijing. Swimming as the fastest entrant in heat five, Fajardo pulled away with a magnificent effort from a scorching field to hit the wall first in a Honduran record and a lifetime best of 27.19. Fajardo failed to advance to the semifinals, as she placed fifty-first overall out of ninety-two swimmers in the prelims.

References

External links
NBC Olympics Profile

1989 births
Living people
Honduran female swimmers
Olympic swimmers of Honduras
Swimmers at the 2008 Summer Olympics
Pan American Games competitors for Honduras
Swimmers at the 2007 Pan American Games
Honduran female freestyle swimmers
People from Puerto Cortés